Mawana is a city in Meerut district in the Uttar Pradesh state of India. It is 26 km from the district headquarters Meerut. Its name comes from the  word "Muhana" which means gateway. It is supposed to be the Muhana of Hastinapur kingdom. Hastinapur is a Mahabharata period town situated 9 km from the city center.

Geography
The river Ganga is 10 km from Mawana. NH-34 joints Meerut to Mawana then Mawana to Bijnor.

Administration
Mawana is a Nagar Palika Parishad city in district of Meerut, Uttar Pradesh (India). Mawana city is divided into 25 wards for which elections are held every five years.

Demographics
As of 2011 Indian Census, Mawana had a total population of 81,443, of which 43,029 were males and 38,414 were females. Population within the age group of 0 to 6 years was 11,426. The total number of literates in Mawana was 49,395, which constituted 60.6% of the population with male literacy of 66.6% and female literacy of 54.0%. The effective literacy rate of 7+ population of Mawana was 70.6%, of which male literacy rate was 77.8% and female literacy rate was 62.5%. The Scheduled Castes and Scheduled Tribes population was 8,347 and 48 respectively. Mawana had 13566 households in 2011.

Work profile 
Out of the total population, 23,562 were engaged in work or business activity. Of this 20,728 were male while 2,834 were female. In the census survey, a worker is defined as person who does business, job, service, and cultivator and labour activity. Of the total 23,562 working population, 84.02% were engaged in main work while 15.98% of the total workers were engaged in marginal work.

Festivals and fairs
Mawana hosts an annual fair named Shaheed Chadrabhan Pradarshani. The founder of Shaheed Chandrabhan Samiti is R. Singh (ret. DSP and freedom fighter). Mela Makhdumpur is famous for Ganga-Snan festival.

Notable people
 Amar Pal Singh – Former Member of Parliament, Meerut

Mawana tehsil - Meerut 

This is a list of all towns and villages in Mawana Tehsil of Meerut district, Uttar Pradesh.

References

Cities and towns in Meerut district